Domestic Archives (Отечественные архивы) is a peer-reviewed academic journal of archival science published in Russia.

It was published as Архивное дело (Archival 

Информационный бюллетень Главного архивного управления МВД СССР (Information Bulletin of the Main Archival Directorate of the Ministry of Internal Affairs of the USSR), and from 1959 to 1965 Вопросы архивоведения (Issues of Archival Studies). From 1966 to 1991 it was Советские архивы (Soviet Archives.

References 

Publications established in 1923
Bimonthly journals
Russian-language journals
Information science journals